The Green Party of Manitoba ('GPM') is a green provincial political party in Manitoba, Canada, founded on November 11, 1998.   The party is legally autonomous from the Green Party of Canada, though for several years many of its members also belonged to the Green Party of Canada in Manitoba, a federal organization established in 1996 (the two organizations were separated in May 2005).  The GPM has maintained a position as the fourth largest party in Manitoba since the 2003 election, both in the number of votes received and candidates run.

History

The GPM is not the first "Green Party" in Manitoba history.  Former New Democrat Nick Ternette established a "Green Party" in Winnipeg in 1989, and fielded candidates under its banner in that year's municipal elections.  Ternette was from the left-wing of the NDP, and opposed the party's centrist direction in the 1980s.  His "Green Party" supported several progressive and environmental causes, and was further to the left than is the current GPM.  None of its candidates were elected, and the party never ran candidates at the provincial level.  Ternette is not affiliated with the GPM, although neither has he opposed it.

The current party was established by Winnipeg electoral reform activist Chris Billows in November 1998, with the assistance of the Green Party of Canada. Billows, Eymond Toupin, and future provincial leader Markus Buchart hosted the Green Party of Canada's national convention in Winnipeg in August 1998.

Policies
The GPM's policies are generally progressive.  The party is primarily focused on environmental issues, and promotes the conservation of land and non-renewable natural resources.  It has expressed concern about "urban sprawl" in Winnipeg's suburbs, has called for reform in Manitoba's commercial hog sector, and generally supports the rights of small farming interests over corporations.

The GPM also favours liberal positions on social issues such as abortion and same-sex marriage, and promotes accessible public health care with emphasis on healthy lifestyles and illness prevention.

The party supports the extension of labour protection laws to farm-workers and a reduction of Manitoba's standard work week from 40 to 32 hours. It has also endorsed full employment, and has criticized Gary Doer's NDP government for not reversing welfare cutbacks enacted by the previous Tory government of Gary Filmon.

2016 Platform

The GPM released its 2016 election platform, entitled "Building a Sustainable Manitoba", on April 5, 2016. The document included promises to introduce Guaranteed Annual Income to Manitoba, a $50/tonne carbon tax, fare-free transit, and oppose the Energy East pipeline, among other items.

Elections

The GPM ran six candidates in the provincial election of 1999, and scored its best result in the Winnipeg riding of Wolseley, where Phyllis Abbé, also a prominent former New Democrat, received 386 votes. Former party leader Markus Buchart ran against Premier Gary Filmon in the riding of Tuxedo, and received 126 votes.  The party received 0.2% of all votes cast in the province.

The GPM ran fourteen candidates in the 2003 election. Buchart received 1193 votes (19.5%) in Wolseley, placing second against New Democrat Rob Altemeyer. The GPM as a whole received 4.08% of the vote in the ridings that it contested.

In the December 13, 2005, by-election held in the strongly conservative Fort Whyte constituency, GPM candidate Shelagh Pizey-Allen garnered 1.77% of the vote.

The GPM ran fifteen candidates in the 2007 election. The fifteen captured 1.33% of the vote, or 5.5% in the electoral divisions that were contested. The Green candidates received 12.32% in Wolseley placing second, 8.46% in Lord Roberts, 7.76% in St. Boniface, 6.38% in Fort Rouge, and third place in Minnedosa ahead of the Liberal Party of Manitoba.

In 2011, the GPM ran 32 candidates across the province and took 2.52% of the vote province-wide, or 10,886 votes, and won 4.56% of votes in ridings they contested. Party leader James Beddome placed second in the Wolseley constituency with 19.64% of the vote, while nine other candidates placed third in various ridings ahead of Liberal candidates.

Leadership
Leaders of the Green Party of Manitoba

Markus Buchart, 1998–2005
Daniel Drimes, 2005
Holly Nelson, 2005–2006
Andrew Basham, 2006–2008
James Beddome, 2008–2013
Alain Landry (interim), 2013–2014
James Beddome, 2014–present

Markus Buchart resigned as party leader in late February 2005.

The party's second leader was Daniel Drimes. He served as leader from April 2 to 22, 2005.

The party's first leadership contest under the rules of Elections Manitoba began on July 1, 2005, and a new leader was chosen on November 20, 2005. She was Holly Nelson, a retired electrical technologist and professional writer who owned a Winnipeg New Age book store, the Philosopher's Stone, during the 1990s.

In September 2006, a few weeks before the party's leadership convention, she stepped down, having accepted an out-of-province job.  On November 19, 2006, the party chose 23-year-old Andrew Basham as its new leader.

On November 15, 2008, James Beddome was elected leader, defeating incumbent leader Andrew Basham and contender Shane Nestruck. Beddome's first term expired November 2010, and he was acclaimed a second term.

Alain Landry was appointed interim party leader for the Manitoba Greens in Nov, 2013  after the resignation of former leader James Beddome. James stepped down to focus on his new career as a lawyer after graduating from the faculty of law at the University of Manitoba in 2013.

Landry ran as a candidate in the 2007 and 2011 elections. In January 2014, he ran in the Morris by-election.

Former leader James Beddome sought to return to the leadership of the Greens and ran in the leadership race held in November 2014. He defeated past Green candidate Kate Storey in the contest with 21 votes to 9 for Storey.

See also 

 List of Green party leaders in Canada
 List of Green politicians who have held office in Canada
 List of Manitoba general elections
 List of political parties in Manitoba
 Politics of Manitoba

References

External links 
 

 
1998 establishments in Manitoba
Environmental organizations based in Manitoba
Organizations based in Winnipeg
Political parties established in 1998
Provincial political parties in Manitoba